Sir Charles Noel Davies (2 December 1933 – 10 February 2015) was a British businessman who chief executive of Vickers Shipbuilding & Engineering Ltd (VSEL) from 1989 to 1995 during the period when the yard built the s that replacing the former Polaris fleet. The Vanguards were armed with Trident missiles.

Born into a Shropshire farming family, Davies was educated at Ellesmere College and started his career at the Austin motor company at Longbridge, going on to Vickers in Barrow and then the Atomic Energy Authority at Harwell. For two years he was chief engineer at the Dounreay nuclear power station in Caithness.

References 

1933 births
2015 deaths
British chief executives
Businesspeople awarded knighthoods
Knights Bachelor
Businesspeople from Shropshire